Hennset or Hendset is a village and ferry point in the municipality of Heim in Trøndelag county, Norway. It lies along Arasvik Fjord between the villages of Liabøen and Valsøyfjord next to European route E39. The ferry connects the village to Arasvika in the municipality of Aure and County Road 682.

References

External links
Hennset at Norgeskart
Arasvika-Hennset ferry schedule

Heim, Norway
Villages in Trøndelag